The 2018–19 Arkansas State Red Wolves women's basketball team represents Arkansas State University during the 2018–19 NCAA Division I women's basketball season. The Red Wolves, led by nineteenth year head coach Brian Boyer, play their home games at First National Bank Arena in Jonesboro, Arkansas as members of the Sun Belt Conference. They finished the season 12–18, 7–11 in Sun Belt play to finish in a ninth place. They lost in the first round of the Sun Belt women's tournament to Coastal Carolina.

On March 20, Bryan Boyer's contract wasn't renewed. He finish at Arkansas State with a 19 year record of 333–287. On March 29, the school hired former Central Arkansas/Marshall head coach and Jonesboro, Arkansas native Matt Daniel for the job.

Roster

Schedule

|-
!colspan=9 style=| Exhibition

|-
!colspan=9 style=| Non-conference regular season

|-
!colspan=9 style=| Sun Belt regular season

|-
!colspan=9 style=| Sun Belt Women's Tournament

See also
2018–19 Arkansas State Red Wolves men's basketball team

References

Arkansas State Red Wolves women's basketball seasons
Arkansas State